The International Rabbinic Fellowship (IRF) is a Modern Orthodox rabbinical organization founded by Rabbis Avi Weiss and Marc D. Angel in 2007 and soon elected Rabbi Barry Gelman as its president. The group is open to graduates of Yeshivat Chovevei Torah. The group's current president is Rabbi Nathaniel Helfgot. The group is noted for being the only Orthodox rabbinical association to admit women rabbis as members.

Overview 
IRF began as a fellowship of Orthodox rabbis and spiritual leaders associated with the Open Orthodox stream within Orthodox Judaism. The organization is viewed as a counterpart to the Rabbinical Council of America, an established modern Orthodox association. In 2010, the association reportedly consisted of approximately 200 members. The differentiation of the positions held by the IRF from those held by other Orthodox associations have led some to point to the irrelevance of denominational labels in contemporary Judaism. Alternatively, the IRF is evidence of a shifting trend, within modern Orthodoxy, away from fundamentalism.

The IRF supports the ordination of women and their role in the clergy. Since 2012, it has admitted female members as members to its association. Prior to this decision, in December 2010, the group had voted against such a proposal. The IRF supports the use of a halachic prenuptial agreement, and in 2012 the group passed a resolution stating that member rabbis may only officiate a wedding if the couple has signed such an agreement.

Publications
 "Halakhic Realities: Collected Essays on Organ Donation" (ed. Zev Farber). Maggid Books, 2017. 
 "Halakhic Realities: Collected Essays on Brain Death" (ed. Zev Farber). Maggid Books, 2016.

References

External links 

Open Orthodox Judaism
Rabbinical organizations
Jewish organizations established in 2007
International Jewish organizations